The River Swincombe is a tributary of the West Dart River that flows through
Dartmoor national park in Devon, south-west England.  It rises south-east of Princetown, and flows 2 km south-east to Foxtor Mires, where it turns north-east to meet the West Dart near Hexworthy.  The first 2 km are known as the Strane River. Some maps show that the source starts north of Nakers Hill and heads north west to the east of Foxtor Mires where it meets the Strane River which (on some maps) is its own river.

References

External links 
UK Rivers Guidebook

Rivers of Devon
Dartmoor
1Swincombe